Stephanie Lee (Korean name: Lee Jeong-ah, on September 14, 1993) is a Korean-American actress and model. She has starred in the Korean television series Schoolgirl Detectives (2014), Partners for Justice (2018), and Start-Up (2020).

Filmography

Film

Television series

Variety shows

Music video appearances

Hosting

Awards and nominations

References

External links

1993 births
Living people
21st-century South Korean actresses
South Korean television actresses
South Korean film actresses